Amy Carter (born March 14, 1970) is a former Democratic-turned-Republican member of the Georgia House of Representatives, representing the 175th district from 2007 until her resignation on December 31, 2017, to become executive director of Advancement at the Technical College System of Georgia. Her district includes Brooks County and parts of Lowndes County and Thomas County, Georgia. 

Carter bears no relation to former President Jimmy Carter, who has a daughter of the same name.

See also

 List of state government committees (Georgia)

References

External links
Amy for Georgia Official Campaign Website
Georgia House of Representatives - Representative Amy Carter official GA House website
Project Vote Smart - Representative Amy Carter (GA) profile
Follow the Money - Amy Carter
2006 campaign contributions

Members of the Georgia House of Representatives
1967 births
Living people
Women state legislators in Georgia (U.S. state)
People from Valdosta, Georgia
Valdosta State University alumni
Georgia (U.S. state) Democrats
Georgia (U.S. state) Republicans
21st-century American politicians
21st-century American women politicians